The waxwings are passerine birds classified in the genus Bombycilla.

Waxwing may also refer to:

 Waxwing (band), a Seattle band
 Waxwing (band Vancouver, BC), a Vancouver, British Columbia band
 The Waxwings, a Detroit band
 Waxwing (rocket motor), a solid rocket motor